Since 2016, the year of its inaugural season (which was then known as the NWHL), the Premier Hockey Federation (PHF) grants several annual awards to players in the league, including Most Valuable Player, Goaltender of the Year, Best Defender, Rookie/Newcomer of the Year, Denna Laing Award (formerly the Perseverance Award), Foundation Award, Leading Scorer Award, and the Fans' Three Stars of the Season. The award for Most Valuable Player is voted on by the Premier Hockey Federation Players' Association. Nominees for the Foundation Award are chosen by the Players Association and voted on by fans. Other awards are voted on a panel of journalists.

Most Valuable Player

Leading Scorer Award

Goaltender of the Year

Defender of the Year

Rookie / Newcomer of the Year

Denna Laing Award (formerly Perseverance Award)

Foundation Award

References

External links 
 PHF Awards

Awards established in 2015
Awards
Awards